Neil Gibson (23 February 1873 – January 1947) was a Scottish footballer, who played for Rangers, Partick Thistle and the Scotland national team.

Career
Adept at playing in either left or right wing half position, Gibson joined Rangers in 1894 from local Larkhall side Royal Albert, where he had been for only a few months after moving from Junior team Larkhall Thistle. During his time at Ibrox, he won four consecutive league titles (1898–99 (in which the team won all 18 fixtures), 1899–1900, 1900–01 and 1901–02) as well as the Scottish Cup in 1896–97, 1897–98, and 1902–03 plus five Glasgow Cups and three Glasgow Merchants Charity Cups.

He moved to Partick Thistle in 1904, where he remained for five years.

He was capped 14 times by Scotland between 1895 and 1905, scoring one goal. Gibson also represented the Scottish League XI 11 times.

Former Hibernian manager Willie McCartney stated that Gibson was "The greatest of my, and any generation following, in Scottish football", Steve Bloomer of Derby County and England described him as "The greatest footballer I ever saw", and Gibson's artistry led Harry Wood to dub him "Pavlova in football boots".

International

International goals 

Scores and results list Scotland's goal tally first.

Personal life
His three sons, Willie, Neil and Jimmy, were also footballers, the latter a Scottish international.

See also
List of Scotland national football team captains
List of Scottish football families

References

External links

1873 births
1947 deaths
Scottish footballers
Association football wing halves
Scotland international footballers
Partick Thistle F.C. players
Rangers F.C. players
Sportspeople from Larkhall
Scottish Football League players
Scottish Football League representative players
Scottish Junior Football Association players
Royal Albert F.C. players
Larkhall Thistle F.C. players
Footballers from South Lanarkshire